Escape from Uganda is a 2013 Malayalam thriller film directed by Rajesh Mohanan. The cast includes Rima Kallingal, Vijay Babu, R. Parthiepan, Joju, Tashu Kaushik, Winston Witecker and also Mukesh in a cameo appearance. The story is by Rajesh Nair, screenplay by Sandeep Robinson, Deepak Prabhakaran and Nithin Bhadran and dialogue by Salin Mankuzy. Several plots as well as the general thread of the movie have an uncanny similarity to the Hollywood thriller The Next Three Days. Escape From Uganda started rolling in Uganda from 7 July. It was shot completely in Uganda and was the first Malayalam film to be shot extensively in Africa.

Plot
Shikha Samuel, along with her husband Jayakrishnan, has chosen of all places in the world, Uganda, to find refuge in, after her family in Kerala objects to their marriage. The couple is leading a happy life with their daughter, Meenakshi. Jayakrishnan is employed as a manager in a coffee shop and Shikha runs a designer boutique of her own. She soon sets up a boutique of her own in the African country. The tranquillity of their life is shattered when Shikha is arrested on the charges of committing two murders, one of the victim is the daughter of the local Mayor, who has pledged to keep her in jail for the rest of her life. Jayakrishnan meets Antony through his working area owner Gautham. Antony gives tips and materials for Shikha to get out of jail. After come out of jail, Jayakrishnan and Shikha finds out that Antony is actually Carlose Kennedy a local Don who was behind the murders, now he wants to trap them. Jayakrishnan who already informed local police of Carlos's evil plans now gets help from local police. Carlos gets arrested. Finally Jayakrishnan and Shikha escape from Uganda by helicopter before the goons could trap and attack.

Cast
 Rima Kallingal as Shikha Samuel
 Vijay Babu as Jayakrishnan
 R. Parthiepan as Antony / Carlose Kennedy
 Joju George as Gautham
 Tashu Kaushik as Angel Mathews
 Mukesh as Firoz (extended cameo)
 Winston Witecker
 Michael Wawuyo
 Sam Bagenda as the Mayor
 Wilberforce Mutete
 Anita Kyalimpa as Oldra
 Carlos George Ombonya
 Baby Durga premjith

Production
Rima Kallingal was signed to play the lead role of a mother of a three-year-old in the film. She was said to be seen in a never before seen avatar, doing some daredevil stunts for the first time in her career. Rima, who is trained in the Kerala martial art form Kalaripayattu and the Manipuri martial art Chau, will be using them in action sequences.

The film's cast also included a few actors from Uganda thanks to Xtrim Casting and Casting Director, Wilber Rugarama. Anita Kyalimpa, first runner up of Miss Uganda 2013, made her acting debut in the film as the murdered daughter of a city mayor, who was played by Ebonies’ Sam Bagenda (aka Dr. Bbosa) while veteran Ugawood actor, Micheal Wawuyo, played the head of military intelligence. Actor and police officer, Wilberforce Mutete, played his day job role in the film too. Brenda Nanyonjo, Miss Uganda organiser and Tricksters star, Carlos Ombonya, were also part of the cast.

The climax of the film was said to be shot in the Luzira Maximum Security Prison, a notorious prison in Uganda. The team claimed that besides shooting at the source of the Nile, they will also can some shots near hot water springs and live volcanoes.

Soundtrack

References

External links
 

2013 films
Films shot in Uganda
2013 thriller films
Indian thriller films
2010s Malayalam-language films
Films scored by Gopi Sundar
Films directed by Rajesh Nair